The white-vented euphonia (Euphonia minuta) is a species of bird in the family Fringillidae.

Description
Both sexes have a whitish midbelly and crissum. Males are blue-black above with a yellow forehead. Their throats are purple-black and their underparts are bright yellow. Females are olive-green above with whitish throats. Their calls consist of single notes, beem or seeu.

Distribution & Habitat
Euphonia minuta is found in two disjunct populations. The first ranges from southern Mexico south along the Pacific coast to northwestern Ecuador, the second across northern South America from the eastern Andean foothills as far east as the state of Pará in Brazil, and south to northern Bolivia.  Its natural habitats are the canopies and borders of moist woodland.

Behaviour
White-vented euphonias often associate with other Euphonia species, forming mixed species flocks.

References

white-vented euphonia
Birds of Central America
Birds of the Amazon Basin
white-vented euphonia
Taxonomy articles created by Polbot